JoJo's Bizarre Adventure is an anime series adapted from Hirohiko Araki's manga of the same name, which was serialized in Weekly Shōnen Jump from 1987 to 2004, and was transferred  to the monthly seinen manga magazine Ultra Jump in 2005. The series focuses on the mysterious adventures of the Joestar family across generations, from the end of the 19th century to modern times. The series was first broadcast on Tokyo MX before entering syndication on 4 JNN stations, BS11, and Animax.

The first season, adapting the first two parts, Phantom Blood and Battle Tendency, aired in Japan between October 2012 and April 2013. The series is distributed in North America by Warner Home Video and Viz Media, with the former handling the series on DVD and the latter handling the series on Blu-Ray and the merchandising rights. In the United States, it aired on Adult Swim's Toonami programming block starting in October 2016.

A second season covering the third part, Stardust Crusaders, was divided in two parts, the first aired between April and September 2014, and the second between January and June 2015.

A third season covering the fourth part, Diamond Is Unbreakable, aired from April to December 2016.

A fourth season covering the fifth part, Golden Wind, aired from October 2018 to July 2019.

A fifth season covering the sixth part, Stone Ocean, debuted worldwide on Netflix. It was divided and released in three parts: the first in December 2021, the second in September 2022 and the third and final in December of the same year. In Japan, this was followed up with a televised run beginning in January 2022.

Series overview

Episode list

Season 1: Phantom Blood & Battle Tendency (2012–13)

Season 2: Stardust Crusaders (2014–15)

Season 3: Diamond Is Unbreakable (2016)

Season 4: Golden Wind (2018–19)

Season 5: Stone Ocean (2021–22)

Notes

References 

JoJo's Bizarre Adventure, 2012